James Jeffrey may refer to:
 James Franklin Jeffrey, American diplomat 
 James S. Jeffrey, Scottish surgeon

See also
 Jeffrey James (disambiguation)